The 1925 AAA Championship Car season consisted of 11 races, beginning in Culver City, California on March 1 and concluding in the same location on November 29.  There were also 8 non-championship races.  The AAA National Champion was Peter DePaolo and the Indianapolis 500 winners were DePaolo and Norman Batten.

Schedule and results
All races running on Dirt/Brick/Board Oval.

Indianapolis 500 was AAA-sanctioned and counted towards the 1925 AIACR World Manufacturers' Championship title.

 Shared drive

Leading National Championship standings

References

See also
 1925 Indianapolis 500

AAA Championship Car season
AAA Championship Car
1925 in American motorsport